The 2019 Powerlist rankings were released in October 2018 and saw Meghan, Duchess of Sussex. included in the list for the first time, and named Ric Lewis as the most influential individual

Top 10

Outside Top 10

Also listed in the 2019 Powerlist were the following people, organised by industry:

Arts, Fashion and Design

 Chi-chi Nwanoku, OBE - Classical musician and founder of Chineke! Orchestra 
 Chris Ofili - Turner Prize winning artist 
 Delia Jarrett-Macauley - Chair of the Caine Prize, writer and academic 
 Duro Olowu  - Fashion designer 
 Dr Shirley J Thompson, OBE - Composer, conductor and Reader in Music, University of Westminster
 Isaac Julien, CBE  - Artist and filmmaker 
 Lemn Sissay, MBE - Poet, author, broadcaster 
 Lynette Yiadom-Boakye - Award-winning artist 
 Matthew Morgan - Founder of Afropunk Festival 
 Pat McGrath - Founder of Pat McGrath Labs, make-up artist
 Valerie Brandes -  Founder and CEO of Jacaranda Books

Business, Corporate, Financiers and Entrepreneurs
 Alan Smith - Global Head of Risk Strategy and Chief of Staff, Global Risk at HSBC
 Brian Robinson - Senior managing director at Goldman Sachs
 Bukola Adisa - Head of Framework and Design at Barclays
 Eric Collins - Head of Operations at Touch Surgery 
 Gary Stewart - Director, Telefonica Open Future and Wayra UK
 Heather Melville - Director and Head of Client Experience, PricewaterhouseCoopers UK.
 Netsai Mangwende - Head of Finance for Great Britain, Willis Towers Watson
 Pamela Hutchinson - Global Head of Diversity and Inclusion, Bloomberg
 Sandra Wallace - UK Managing Partner, DLA Piper
 Tunji Akintokun - Director at Cisco leading mid-market sales and partnerships for Africa
 Wol Kolade -  Managing Partner, Livingbridge
 Yvonne Ike  - Managing Director and Head of Sub-Saharan Africa region, BofA Securities

Media, Publishing and Entertainment
 Ade Adepitan, MBE - TV presenter and Paralympic wheelchair basketball player
 Afua Hirsch - Journalist, author, broadcaster
 Akala - Rapper, journalist, poet and activist
 Anne Mensah - Vice-president of Content UK, Netflix
 Amma Asante, MBE - Writer, director
 Charlene White - ITN News anchor
 David Harewood, MBE - Actor
 David Olusoga, OBE - Historian, joint Creative Director of Uplands Television Ltd
 Dumi Oburota - Founder of Disturbing London
 Femi Oguns, MBE - Founder and CEO of Identity School of Acting
 Gary Younge - Journalist and author
 Idris Elba, OBE - Actor, writer, producer, musician and DJ
 Jacqueline Simmons - Executive editor at Bloomberg L.P.
 John Boyega - Actor
 Kanya King, CBE -CEO/Founder, MOBO Awards
 Marcus Ryder - Chief International Editor of China Global Television Network Digital
 Mo Abudu - CEO/Executive Chair, EbonylifeTV
 Naomie Harris, OBE - Actor
 Paulette Simpson - Executive, Corporate Affairs and Public Policy, Jamaica National Group; Executive Director, The Voice Media Group
 Reggie Yates - Actor, broadcaster and DJ
 Reni Eddo-Lodge - Journalist, author
 Simon Frederick - Artist, photographer, director
 Sir Lenny Henry - Actor, writer, campaigner
 Stormzy - Grime artist
 Thandie Newton - Actor
 Tunde Ogungbesan - BBC head of diversity and inclusion
 Vanessa Kingori, MBE - Publisher, British Vogue
 Wayne Hector - Songwriter
 Yolisa Phahle - CEO, M-Net

Politics, Law and Religion
 Baroness Floella Benjamin DBE, DL - Peer, House of Lords, Policy maker, campaigner for children's rights
 Chuka Umunna - Labour Member of Parliament for Streatham
 Grace Ononiwu, CBE - Crown Prosecutor
 Joshua Siaw, MBE - Partner, White & Case
 Dr Kathryn Nwajiaku - Co-Director at Development Results
 David Lammy, MP - Member of Parliament for Tottenham

Public, Third Sector and Education
 Beverley Lewis, OBE - Co-Founder and Director of Operations, ACLT (African Caribbean Leukemia Trust)
 Dr Cheron Byfield - Governor and Trust Member of King Solomon International Business School 
 Dr Margaret Casely-Hayford, CBE - Chair, Shakespeare's Globe, lawyer and businessperson
 Marvin Rees - Mayor of Bristol
 Meghan, Duchess of Sussex - Campaigner, actress
 Nero Ughwujabo - Special Adviser to the Prime Minister Theresa May
 Nira Chamberlain - President of Institute of Mathematics and its Applications
 Orin Lewis, OBE - Co-founder and chief-executive, ACLT (African Caribbean Leukemia Trust)
 Patricia Gallan - Retired Metropolitan Police Service assistant commissioner leading specialist crime and operations
 Lord Woolley - Co-founder/Director, Operation Black Vote
 David Waboso - Managing director of Network Rail's Digital Railway

Science, Medicine and Engineering
 Dr Emeka Okaro - Consultant Obstetrician and Gynaecologist
 Dr Ian Nnatu - Consultant psychiatrist at Charing Cross Hospital and Medical Director at Cygnet Hospital Harrow
 Dr Joy Odili - Consultant plastic surgeon at St George's Hospital
 Dr Sylvia Bartley - Senior Global Director, Medtronic Philanthropy
 Dr Samantha Tross - Consultant Orthopaedic Surgeon
 Prof. Laura Serrant, OBE - Head of Department and Professor of Community and Public Health Nursing at Manchester Metropolitan University

Sports
 Anthony Joshua, OBE - Boxer
 Denise Lewis - TV presenter and Olympic Gold medal-winning athlete
 Dina Asher Smith - British record-holding sprinter
 Lewis Hamilton, MBE - Formula One champion
 Luol Deng - Former NBA player
 Sir Mo Farah - Olympic Gold medal-winning athlete

Technology
 Baroness Oona King - Strategy for equity, diversity, inclusion & integrity for Google
 Ian Greenstreet - Founder and Chairman, Infinity Capital Partners and Member on the Advisory Board, London Stock Exchange
 Janet Thomas - Founder and CEO of TouchFX at Infinity Capital Partners
 Mariéme Jamme - CEO, SpotOne Global Solutions and Advisory Board Member, Data-Pop Alliance
 Martin Ijaha, CBE - Founder, Neyber
 Nneka Abulokwe, OBE - Founder and CEO, MicroMax Consulting

References

External links
 Powerlist

Black British people

Biographical dictionaries
Lists of British people
Yearbooks